Parkhurst Academy currently known as Mr Price Parkhurst Academy for sponsorship reasons is a South African football club. They play in the Vodacom League and were founded in 1996 following a split from Kenpark United.

References

Soccer clubs in South Africa
1996 establishments in South Africa